Personality changes are changes in individuals personalities over time. Originally thought to be concrete and unchanging, recent studies have found evidence that personality can change throughout a person's life.

Personality refers to individual differences in characteristic patterns of thinking, feeling and behaving. Every person has their own "individual differences in particular personality characteristics" that separate them from others. The overall study of personality "focuses on two broad areas: One is understanding individual differences in particular personality characteristics... The other is understanding how the various parts of a person come together as a whole."

One's personality is made up of events, circumstances, and genetics, that come together to influence the development of defining characteristics and traits. Those traits and characteristics that define someone are what the general public like to describe as personality.

With each person having their own personality, there are bound to be many differences and changes that confuse people. Personality psychologists have taken much time to search for answers and solutions to the changes that can come to someone's personality. Although there is little research overall, there has been compelling initial evidence for personality change. The development of personality is often dependent on the stage of life a person is in, and the extent to which one's levels of characteristics, relative to their age cohort, is stable across long periods of time. Cultural and environmental influence are large factors in personality trait differences. Personality change is usually seen over longer periods of time and is analogical to height, as most development occurs in the earlier stages of life and becomes more stable as one grows into adulthood. The Big Five, or Five Factor Model, is the most widely accepted form of personality theory, and especially in terms of personality change. While still uncertain, research suggests that genetics play a role in the change and stability of certain traits in a personality. They have also discovered environmental and situational/contextual sources affect personality. Some debates have pervaded the field of psychology since its beginning. One of the most debated topics has to do with the nature and development of personality. Personality psychology studies one's distinctive style of cognition, behavior, and affect. However, this concept elicits discord among psychologists as some have insisted that it does not exist, while others struggle with issues of measurement.

Definition of personality
Personality, one's characteristic way of feeling, behaving and thinking, is often conceptualized as a person's standing on each Big Five personality trait (extraversion, neuroticism, openness to experience, agreeableness and conscientiousness). A person's personality profile is thus gauged from their standing on five broad concepts which predict, among other life outcomes, behavior and the quality of interpersonal relationships. Initially, it was believed that one's Big Five profile was static and dichotomous in that one was either at one extreme of each trait or another  
For example, people are typically categorized as introverted or extraverted. Personality was therefore assessed in terms of generalities or averages. In noticing the strong inconsistencies in how people behaved across situations, some psychologists dismissed personality as nonexistent.

This school of thought attributes human behavior to environmental factors, relegating individual differences to situational artifacts and contesting the existence of individual predispositions. It was led by situationists like Walter Mischel (1968). Their contention held that personality was a fictitious concept.  For them, the discrepancies observed across one's behaviors were evidence that inter-individual differences did not exist 
Some aspects of the situationist perspective even suggest that all human beings are the same and that the differences we observe are simply illusory byproducts of the environment. 
          
However, personality experts (sometimes referred to as personologists) soon integrated these inconsistencies into their conceptualization of personality. They modified the old, more monolithic construct by measuring how people differ across situations. Their new methods of personality assessment describe fluctuations in personality characteristics that are consistent and predictable for each person, based on his predispositions and the environment they are in. Some work suggests that people can adopt different levels of a personality dimension as the social situations and time of day change.
         
Therefore, someone is not conscientious all of the time, but can be conscientious at work and a lot less so when they are home. This work also suggests that intrapersonal variations on a trait can be even larger than interpersonal variations. Extraversion varies more within a person than across individuals, for example. This work was based on individual self-ratings during the day across a long period of time. This allowed for researchers to assess moment-to-moment and day to day variations on personality attributes.

The impact of social roles
In addition, social roles (e.g. employee) have been identified as potential sources of personality change. Researchers have found strong correspondences between the demands of a social role and one's personality profile. 
If the role requires that the person enacting it be conscientious, her standing on this trait is more likely to be high. Conversely, once he leaves that role or takes on another which entails less conscientiousness, he will manifest a lower level standing on that trait. Longitudinal research demonstrates that people's personality trajectories can often be explained by the social roles they adopted and relinquished throughout their life stages. Thus social roles are often studied as fundamental predictors of personality. 
The goals associated with them elicit the appropriation of certain personality profiles by the people enacting them. For example, employees judged effective by their peers and superiors are often described as conscientious.  
            
Personality also changes through life stages. This may be due to physiological changes associated with development but also experiences that impact behavior. Adolescence and young adulthood have been found to be prime periods of personality changes, especially in the domains of extraversion and agreeableness. It has long been believed that personality development is shaped by life experiences that intensify the propensities that led individuals to those experiences in the first place, which is known as the Correspondence Principle.

Subsequent research endeavors have integrated these findings in their methods of investigation. Researchers distinguish between mean level and rank order changes in trait standing during old age. 
Their study of personality trajectories is thus contingent on time and on age considerations. Mottus, Johnson and Geary (2012) found that instability engendered by aging does not necessarily affect one's standing within an age cohort. Hence, fluctuations and stability coexist so that one changes relative to one's former self but not relative to one's peers. Similarly, other psychologists found that Neuroticism, Extraversion (only in men), and Openness decreased with age after 70, but Conscientiousness and Agreeableness increased with age (the latter only in men). Moreover, they suggest that there is a decline on each trait after the age of 81.

Inconsistency as a trait
Personality inconsistency has become such a prevalent consideration for personologists that some even conceptualize it as a predisposition in itself. Fleisher and Woehr (2008) suggest that consistency across the Big Five is a construct that is fairly stable and contributes to the predictive validity of personality measures. Hence, inconsistency is quantifiable much like a trait, and constitutes an index of - and enhances - the fit of psychological models.

To accommodate the inconsistency demonstrated on personality tests, researchers developed the Frame Of Reference principle (FOR). According to this theory, people tend to think of their personality in terms of a specific social context when they are asked to rate them.  Whichever environment is cognitively salient at the time of the personality measurement will influence the respondent's ratings on a trait measure.
If, for example, the person is thinking in terms of their student identity, then the personality ratings he reports will most likely reflect the profile he espouses in the context of student life. Accounting for the FOR principle aims at increasing the validity of personality measures.  This demonstrates that the predictive validity of personality measures which specify a social context is a lot higher than those measures which take a more generic approach.
          
This point is substantiated by yet another body of work suggesting that FOR instructions moderated the link between extraversion and openness scores on manager ratings of employee performance 
This research thus recognizes that the importance of intrapersonal fluctuations contingent on personality is context specific and is not necessarily generalizable across social domains and time.

Process of change
If "Personality ... is one of the strongest and most consistent predictors of subjective well-being," then does personality not change? In fact, "personality does change". But what makes that happen?

Most people, in their lifetime, will experience an event that opens their eyes to a new understanding of the world. For example, someone who is carefree and happy might become more serious and stern after experiencing abuse in a relationship. Another who is serious and stern might become more happy and interested in life after finding a religion that provides them with closure and answered questions. Each day of life is met with events and situations that result in a response from those who experience them - and sometimes, these events can change who we are and how we think at the core.

Research has found a correlation between being multilingual and personality, specifically how one may change personality based on the language currently being spoken. One who is raised bilingual or lived a number of years in a foreign country and learned the language of the land not only experience personality change but often adopt different personalities based on the language they are speaking. These changes are often based on cultural norms of the language's origin.

A study published in 2012 found that "personality does change and that the extent to which personality changes is comparable to other characteristics, such as income, unemployment and marital status". Some of the biggest concerns faced in life are the previously listed factors - how much money does one make (income)? Does one have a job or not (unemployment)? Does one have a lifelong companion (marital status)? These situations can lead to bigger, more complex situations. If one seeks to be married but is not, they may become cold. If one has no job but then gets hired somewhere, they may become grateful and filled with hope. When positive changes happen, "personality ... meaningfully predicts changes to life satisfaction". Simply, when one experiences a personality change, it can strongly determine how that person will then feel about life.

Change over a lifetime
There are two very specific types of change that researchers tend to focus on: rank-order change and mean-level change. A rank-order change refers to a change in an individual's personality trait relative to other individuals; such changes do not occur very often.
A mean-level change refers to an absolute change in the individual's level of a certain trait over time. Longitudinal research shows that mean-level change does occur. However, some traits tend to change while some traits tend to stay stable.

During adolescence there are many increases or rapid changes in hormones, societal pressures, and environment factors, among other things. These things theoretically factor into significant personality changes as one progresses through adolescence. As a person progresses through adulthood, their personality becomes more stable and predictable because they establish patterns of thinking, behaving, and feeling.

Personality does not stop changing at a specific age. Biological and social transitions in life may also be a factor for change. Biological transitions are stages like puberty or giving birth for the first time. Social transitions might be changes in social roles like becoming a parent or working at a first job. These life transitions do not necessarily cause change, but they may be reasons for change. As humans we do not adapt just in our body. Our mind also makes changes to itself in order to thrive in our environment. One theory says that whether or not these life transitions cause personality change is based on whether the transition was expected based on age or was unforeseen. The events that are expected will cause personality change because those events have common scripts. However, events that are unexpected will give prominence to the traits that already exist for the individual. Historical context also affects personality change. Major life events can lead to changes in personality that can persist for more than a decade. A longitudinal study followed women over 30 years and found that they showed increases in individualism. This may have been due to the changes that were occurring in their country at the time.

Stressful life events and trauma
Negative life events, long-term difficulties, and deteriorated life quality, all predict small but persistent increases in neuroticism, while positive life events, and improved life quality, predict small but persistent decreases in neuroticism. There appears to be no point during the lifespan that neuroticism is immutable, which is known as the Plasticity Principle.

While extreme, traumatic brain injury can impact a person's personality, even having an effect throughout the rest of their life.

Mechanisms of change
There are multiple ways for an individual's personality to change. Individuals will change their behavior based on the ideas in their environment that emit rewards and punishments. Some of these ideas might be implicit, like social roles. The individual changes his or her personality to fit into a social role if it is favorable. Other ideas might be more explicit like a parent trying to change a child's behavior.
An individual may decide to actively try to change his or her own behavior/ personality after thinking about his or her own actions. Therapy involves the same type of introspection. The individual along with the therapist identifies the behaviors that are inappropriate, and then self-monitors in order to change them. Eventually the individual internalizes the behavior they want to attain, and that trait will generalize to other areas of the individual's life. 
Personality change also occurs when individuals observe the actions of others. Individuals may mimic the behaviors of others and then internalize those behaviors. Once the individual internalizes those behaviors they are said to be a part of that person's personality.
Individuals also receive feedback from other individuals or groups about their own personality. This is a driving force of change because the individual has social motivations to change his or her personality; people often act a certain way based on the popular/majority vote of the people they are around. For example, a girl who likes country music may say she hates country music when she learns that all her peers don't like country music. It has also been shown that major positive and negative life events can predict changes in personality. Some of the largest changes are observed in individuals with psychiatric or neurodegenerative disorders, such as Alzheimer's disease and related dementia. A meta-analyses found consistent evidence that large increases in neuroticism and large declines on the other major personality traits are observed in individuals with dementia.

 Meditation

Studies have shown that mindfulness-meditation therapies have a positive effect of personality maturity.

 Cognitive Behavioral Therapy

Cognitive Behavioral Therapy has been tested and proved to be effective in the treatment of adults with anxiety disorders.

 Psilocybin Therapy

Following psilocybin therapy one study communicates that Neuroticism scores lowered substantially while Extraversion increased.

The Big Five personality traits
The Big Five personality traits are often used to measure change in personality. There is a mean-level change in the Big Five traits from age 10 to 65.
The trends seen in adulthood are different from trends seen in childhood and adolescence. Some research suggests that during adolescence rank-order change does occur and therefore personality is relatively unstable. Gender differences are also shown before adulthood.  Conscientiousness drops from late childhood to adolescence, but then picks back up from adolescence into adulthood. As well, a meta-analysis done by Melissa C. O'Connor and Sampo V. Paunonen, "Big Five Personality Predictors of Post-Secondary Academic Performance", 2006, showed that "... conscientiousness, in particular, [is] most strongly and consistently associated with academic success". Agreeableness also drops from late childhood to adolescence, but then picks back up from adolescence into adulthood. Neuroticism shows a different trend for males and females in childhood and adolescence. For females, Neuroticism increases from childhood to adolescence. Then Neuroticism levels from adolescence into adulthood and continues the adult trend of decreasing. Males however, tend to gradually decrease in Neuroticism from childhood to adolescence into adulthood. Extraversion drops from childhood to adolescence and then does not significantly change. Openness to experience also shows a different trend for different genders. Females tend to decrease in Openness to experience from childhood to early adulthood and then gradually increases all throughout adulthood. Males tend to decrease in Openness to experience from childhood to adolescence, then it tends to increase through adulthood. In the same study done by O'Connor and Paunonen, "Openness to Experience was sometimes positively associated with scholastic achievement..." In adulthood, Neuroticism tends to decrease, while Conscientiousness and Agreeableness tend to increase. Extraversion and Openness to experience do not seem to change much during adulthood. These trends seen in adulthood are different from trends seen in childhood and adolescence. Cross-cultural research shows that German, British, Czech, and Turkish people show similar trends of these personality traits. Similar trends seem to exist in other countries.

In a study done by Deborah A. Cobb-Clark and Stefanie Schurer, "The Stability of Big-Five Personality Traits," done in 2011, showed that "On average, individuals report slightly higher levels of agreeableness, emotional stability, and conscientiousness than extraversion and openness to experience. [On top of that], women report higher scores on each trait except for openness to experience". For clarification, openness to experience can be referred to simply as openness. It is often seen as one's willingness to embrace new things, new ideas, and new activities.

The Big Five personality traits can also be broken down into facets. Different facets of each personality trait are often correlated with different behavioral outcomes. Breaking down the personality traits into facets is difficult and not yet at a consensus. However, it is important to look at change in facets over a lifetime separate from just the change in traits because different facets of the same trait show different trends.  For example, openness with values decreases substantially with age, while openness with aesthetics is more stable. Neuroticism can be broken into the two facets of anxiety and depression. Anxiety has the same trend as Neuroticism for both males and females. For females, anxiety increases from childhood to adolescence, at emerging adulthood it levels out, and then starts to decrease into and throughout middle age. Anxiety in males tends to decrease from late childhood through adulthood. Depression (not clinical depression, but rather susceptibility to negative affect) shows two peaks in females. Females tend to have higher levels of this kind of depression in adolescence and then again in early adulthood. Depression does, however, have a negative trend through adulthood. For males, depression tends to show an increase from childhood to early adulthood and then shows a slight decrease through middle age. There are four facets that accompany Extraversion. They are social self-esteem, liveliness, social boldness, and sociability. Social Self-esteem, liveliness, and social boldness starts to increase during our mid-teens and continually increases throughout early adulthood and into late adulthood. Sociability seems to follow a different trend that is pretty high during our early teens but tends to decrease in early-adulthood and then stabilize around the age of 39.

Late life changes 
Although there is debate surrounding whether or not personality can change in the late stages of life, more evidence is being discovered about how the environmental factors affect people of all ages. Changes in health are regarded as an influential source of personality stability and change. Across multiple facets of health which include cognitive, physical, and sensory functioning, older adults' ability to maintain their everyday routine and lifestyle is being challenged. There are noticeable finds on reverse trends in maturity-related traits, such as increases in neuroticism and declines in conscientiousness. Mainly the debate in this area revolves around whether the health consequences of old age can be linked to changes in traits and whether these changes can, in turn, impair health and functioning.

References

Further reading

Mischel, W. (1968). Personality and assessment. Hoboken, NJ US: John Wiley & Sons Inc.

Boyce, C.J., Wood, A.M. & Powdthavee, N. Is Personality Fixed? Personality Changes as Much as “Variable” Economic Factors and More Strongly Predicts Changes to Life Satisfaction. Soc Indic Res111, 287–305 (2013). https://doi.org/10.1007/s11205-012-0006-z

Personality